A majority government is a government by one or more governing parties that hold an absolute majority of seats in a legislature. This is as opposed to a minority government, where the largest party in a legislature only has a plurality of seats. A government majority determines the balance of power.

A majority government is usually assured of having its legislation passed and rarely if ever, has to fear being defeated in parliament, a state is also known as a working majority. In contrast, a minority government must constantly bargain for support from other parties in order to pass legislation and avoid being defeated on motions of no confidence. Single-party majority governments tend be formed in the aftermath of strong election performances.

The term "majority government" may also be used for a stable coalition of two or more parties to form an absolute majority. One example of such an electoral coalition is in Australia, where the Liberal and National parties have run as an electoral bloc for decades.

Another example was the 2010–2015 coalition government in the United Kingdom, which was composed of the Conservative and Liberal Democrat parties. The Conservatives won the most seats of any single party in the 2010 election, but fell short of an absolute majority. However, by combining with the Liberal Democrats a solid majority in the House of Commons was created. This was the first true coalition government in the UK since World War II.

See also
Coalition government
Hung parliament
Minority government

References

Political terminology